Klaf or KLAF may refer to:
 Klaf, (or kelaf;), the designation given a particular piece of skin
 KLAF-LD, a low-power television station (channel 14, virtual 14) licensed to serve Lafayette, Louisiana, United States
 Purdue University Airport, a public-use airport in Tippecanoe County, Indiana, United States